The 2012 elections for the Pennsylvania House of Representatives were held on November 6, 2012, with all districts being contested. The primary elections were held on April 24, 2012. The term of office for those elected in 2012 began when the House of Representatives convened in January 2013. Pennsylvania State Representatives are elected for two-year terms, with all 203 seats up for election every two years.

Make-up of the House

2012 General election

Source: Pennsylvania Department of State

References

2012 Pennsylvania elections
2012
Pennsylvania House of Representatives